South Reston is a village in the East Lindsey district of Lincolnshire, England.

The civil parish of South Reston was enlarged by the abolition of the parish of Castle Carlton in 1936. Today both villages form part of Reston civil parish .

South Reston parish church was dedicated to Saint Edith; it was declared redundant by the Diocese of Lincoln in 1980, and demolished in 1982. The 15th-century octagonal font remains in the churchyard, as a sundial, and is Grade II listed.

The Hall is a Grade II listed brick farmhouse dating from the 17th century.

South Reston school was built in 1858 and survived long enough to celebrate its centenary.

There is also a Methodist church and a public house, the Waggon and Horses.

References

Villages in Lincolnshire
East Lindsey District